Storavatnet is a lake just southwest of the village of Loddefjord in the city of Bergen in Vestland county, Norway.

There is a small man-made dam on the southwest coast, regulating the one natural outlet for the  lake.  The major highway junction of Norwegian County Road 562 and Norwegian National Road 555 lies on the northern shore of the lake.  Route 562 heads north to the Askøy Bridge going to the island of Askøy.  Route 555 heads west to the Sotra Bridge which goes to the island of Sotra.  The terminal in Loddefjord, near the lake is the proposed end of the new Loddefjord branch of the Bergen Light Rail system.

See also
List of lakes in Norway

References

Geography of Bergen
Lakes of Vestland
Reservoirs in Norway